Shah Md. Soliman Alam is a Jatiya Party (Ershad) politician and the former Member of Parliament of Rangpur-5.

Career
Alam was elected to parliament from Rangpur-5 as a Jatiya Party candidate in 2001.

References

Jatiya Party politicians
Living people
8th Jatiya Sangsad members
People from Mymensingh District
Year of birth missing (living people)